88 Poems is a book of the collected poetry of author Ernest Hemingway, published in 1979. It includes a number of poems published in magazines, the poems which appeared in Hemingway's first book, Three Stories and Ten Poems, and 47 previously unpublished poems that were found in private collections and in the Hemingway papers held by the Kennedy Library.

References

External links
 Literary Encyclopedia review by Robert E Fleming

1979 poetry books
American poetry collections
Books by Ernest Hemingway
Books published posthumously
Harcourt (publisher) books